Gwadar Bay is located in the Gulf of Oman on the maritime border of Pakistan and Iran. The name is from Persian, Khalij-e Gavader or "Gulf of Gwadar" on the Arabian Sea. It is an inlet of the Arabian Sea indenting the sandy Makran coast at the Iran–Pakistan border. The Dashtiari River flows into it from the northwest, and the Dasht River from the northeast. The town of Jiwani is located on the eastern end of the Gwadar Bay.

Bays of Pakistan
Iran–Pakistan border
Gulf of Oman
Headlands of Pakistan
Gwadar District
Landforms of Balochistan (Pakistan)
Gulfs of Iran